Stange is a surname. Notable people with the surname include:

 Bernd Stange (born 1948), German football manager
 Howie Stange, American musician
 Hugh Stanislaus Stange (1894–1966), American playwright
 Iekeliene Stange (born 1984), Dutch fashion model
 Janne Stange (born 1986), Norwegian football defender
 Lee Stange (born 1936), former Major League Baseball pitcher
 Rodolfo Stange (born 1925), Chilean politician and former senator
 Stanislaus Stange (1862–1917), Anglo-American lyricist and playwright
 Ulrike Stange (born 1984), German handball player
 Ute Stange (born 1966), German rower
Surnames from nicknames